The 1977 PBA Open Conference Finals is the best-of-5 basketball championship series of the 1977 PBA Open Conference, and the conclusion of the conference's playoffs. The U-Tex Wranglers and Crispa Redmanizers played for the 8th championship contested by the league. 

Crispa Redmanizers won against U-Tex Wranglers, 3 games to 2, for an amazing sixth straight PBA title and a quest for another grandslam season.

Qualification

Games summary

Broadcast notes

References

Crispa Redmanizers games
1977
1977 PBA season
U/Tex Wranglers games
PBA Open Conference Finals